Green Township is one of the eleven townships of Hocking County, Ohio, United States. As of the 2010 census the population was 3,261, up from 2,585 at the 2000 census. As of 2010, 2,631 of the population lived in the unincorporated portion of the township.

Geography
Located in the eastern part of the county, it borders the following townships:
Falls Township (northeastern portion) - north
Ward Township - east
York Township, Athens County - southeast corner
Starr Township - south
Washington Township - southwest
Falls Township (southwestern portion) - west
Marion Township - northwest

Parts of the city of Logan, the county seat of Hocking County, are located in western Green Township.  Southeast of Logan lies the unincorporated community of Haydenville.

Name and history
Green Township was organized in 1825.

It is one of sixteen Green Townships statewide.

Government
The township is governed by a three-member board of trustees, who are elected in November of odd-numbered years to a four-year term beginning on the following January 1. Two are elected in the year after the presidential election and one is elected in the year before it. There is also an elected township fiscal officer, who serves a four-year term beginning on April 1 of the year after the election, which is held in November of the year before the presidential election. Vacancies in the fiscal officership or on the board of trustees are filled by the remaining trustees.

References

External links
County website
Township website

Townships in Hocking County, Ohio
Townships in Ohio